Jesus Martinez (born December 26, 1983) is an American mixed martial artist who competes in Bellator's welterweight division.

Mixed martial arts career

Early career
Martinez started his professional career in 2009. He fought mainly for New Jersey and Pennsylvania-based promotions as Ring of Combat and Xtreme Fight Events.

In 2011, with a record of six victories and only one loss, Martinez signed with Bellator.

Bellator MMA
Martinez made his promotional debut against Karl Amoussou on November 26, 2011 at Bellator 59. Martinez lost via TKO in the first round.

Martinez faced Aung La Nsang on May 11, 2012 at Bellator 68. Despite being dropped with a right hand early, Nsang was able to recover and defeat Martinez via TKO still in the first round.

Cage Fury Fighting Championships
Martinez faced George Sullivan on August 17, 2013 at CFFC 26: Sullivan vs. Martinez for the CFFC welterweight title. He lost via TKO in the second round.

Bellator return
Martinez replaced Dante Rivera against Nah-Shon Burrell on November 15, 2013 at Bellator 108. He lost the fight via unanimous decision (30-27, 30-27, 29-28). Martinez was then expected to face Phil Baroni on May 2, 2014 at Bellator 118, however the bout was cancelled for unknown reasons, and Martinez instead faced Ryan Caltaldi at the event. He won the bout via unanimous decision.

Mixed martial arts record

|-
| Loss
| align=center| 9–6
| LeVon Maynard
| TKO (punches)
| Matrix Fights 9
| 
| align=center| 2
| align=center| 4:37
| Philadelphia, Pennsylvania, United States
| 
|-
| Win
| align=center| 9–5
| Ryan Caltaldi
| Decision (unanimous)
| Bellator 118
| 
| align=center| 3
| align=center| 5:00
| Atlantic City, New Jersey, United States
| 
|-
| Loss
| align=center| 8–5
| Nah-Shon Burrell
| Decision (unanimous)
| Bellator 108
| 
| align=center| 3
| align=center| 5:00
| Atlantic City, New Jersey, United States
| 
|-
| Loss
| align=center| 8–4
| George Sullivan
| TKO (punches)
| CFFC 26: Sullivan vs. Martinez
| 
| align=center| 2
| align=center| 3:12
| Atlantic City, New Jersey, United States
| 
|-
| Win
| align=center| 8–3
| Chase Owens
| KO (punches)
| Xtreme Fight Events: Cage Wars 22
| 
| align=center| 1
| align=center| 1:04
| Chester, Pennsylvania, United States
| 
|-
| Win
| align=center| 7–3
| Tiawan Howard
| Submission (armbar)
| Matrix Fights 7
| 
| align=center| 1
| align=center| 3:10
| Philadelphia, Pennsylvania, United States
| 
|-
| Loss
| align=center| 6–3
| Aung La Nsang
| TKO (punches)
| Bellator 68
| 
| align=center| 1
| align=center| 0:36
| Atlantic City, New Jersey, United States
| 
|-
| Loss
| align=center| 6–2
| Karl Amoussou
| TKO (punches)
| Bellator 59
| 
| align=center| 1
| align=center| 2:20
| Atlantic City, New Jersey, United States
| 
|-
| Win
| align=center| 6–1
| Christopher Wing
| KO (head kick)
| Matrix Fights 4
| 
| align=center| 2
| align=center| 1:16
| Philadelphia, Pennsylvania, United States
| 
|-
| Loss
| align=center| 5–1
| Doug Gordon
| TKO (punches)
| Xtreme Fight Events: Cage Wars 4
| 
| align=center| 1
| align=center| 0:50
| Boothwyn, Pennsylvania, United States
| 
|-
| Win
| align=center| 5–0
| Chip Moraza-Pollard
| Decision (unanimous)
| KOTC: No Mercy
| 
| align=center| 3
| align=center| 5:00
| Mashantucket, Connecticut, United States
| 
|-
| Win
| align=center| 4–0
| Eddie Larrea
| Decision (unanimous)
| Xtreme Fight Events: Cage Wars 2
| 
| align=center| 3
| align=center| 5:00
| Broomall, Pennsylvania, United States
| 
|-
| Win
| align=center| 3–0
| Cory Popanz
| Submission (guillotine choke)
| Locked in the Cage 4
| 
| align=center| 1
| align=center| 0:23
| Philadelphia, Pennsylvania, United States
| 
|-
| Win
| align=center| 2–0
| Dustin Carroll
| TKO (punches)
| Xtreme Fight Events: Cage Wars
| 
| align=center| 1
| align=center| 1:06
| Aston, Pennsylvania, United States
| 
|-
| Win
| align=center| 1–0
| Jim Tomczuk
| Decision (unanimous)
| Ring of Combat 27
| 
| align=center| 3
| align=center| 4:00
| Atlantic City, New Jersey, United States
|

References

1983 births
Living people
American male mixed martial artists
Mixed martial artists from Pennsylvania
Welterweight mixed martial artists
Mixed martial artists utilizing Brazilian jiu-jitsu
American practitioners of Brazilian jiu-jitsu
People awarded a black belt in Brazilian jiu-jitsu
Sportspeople from Philadelphia